Swats can mean:
 Swats (drink), a liquid, which may be drunk, produced as a by-product of the making of the Scottish dish sowans
 The S.W.A.T.S., a nickname for southwestern Atlanta and adjacent areas